Phoenicocoris is a genus of plant bugs in the family Miridae. There are about 16 described species in Phoenicocoris.

Species
These 16 species belong to the genus Phoenicocoris:

 Phoenicocoris australis (Blatchley, 1926)
 Phoenicocoris claricornis (Knight, 1923)
 Phoenicocoris crataegi (Knight, 1931)
 Phoenicocoris dissimilis (Reuter, 1878)
 Phoenicocoris hesperus (Knight, 1968)
 Phoenicocoris longirostris (Knight, 1968)
 Phoenicocoris minusculus (Knight, 1923)
 Phoenicocoris modestus (Meyer-Dür, 1843)
 Phoenicocoris nevadensis Schwartz & Stonedahl, 2004
 Phoenicocoris obscurellus (Fallén, 1829)
 Phoenicocoris opacus (Reuter, 1906)
 Phoenicocoris pallidicornis Schwartz & Stonedahl, 2004
 Phoenicocoris ponderosae Schwartz & Stonedahl, 2004
 Phoenicocoris rostratus (Knight, 1923)
 Phoenicocoris strobicola (Knight, 1923)
 Phoenicocoris vidali (Lindberg, 1940)

References

Further reading

External links

 

Phylinae
Articles created by Qbugbot